The Rocks of Valpre is a 1935 British crime film directed by Henry Edwards and starring John Garrick, Winifred Shotter and Leslie Perrins. The film was made at Twickenham Studios. It was based on the 1913 novel of the same name by Ethel M. Dell, and was released in the U.S. as High Treason. The film is set in the mid-nineteenth century with plot elements resembling the later Dreyfus Case.

Plot summary
While staying in a small French coastal town, a young English woman falls in love with a French cavalry officer. Their romance is dramatically cut short when she is sent back to England to finish her education in a convent, while he is wrongly accused of being a spy by a rival officer and sentenced to imprisonment on Devil's Island. She settles down to a comfortable and respectable marriage with a wealthy Englishman. Ten years later, however, she is threatened with blackmail, and her former lover escapes from Devil's Island to come to her aid. Seriously ill from his time on the penal colony, he dies shortly afterwards.

Cast
 John Garrick as Louis de Monteville
 Winifred Shotter as Christine Wyndham
 Leslie Perrins as Captain Rodolphe
 Michael Shepley as Trevor Mordaunt
 Lewis Shaw as Noel Wyndham
 Athene Seyler as Aunt Philippa
 Agnes Imlay as Madamoiselle Gautier

Critical reception
TV Guide dismissed it as a "Sappy drama."

See also
The Rocks of Valpre (1919)

References

External links

1935 films
1935 crime films
1930s historical films
British historical films
British crime films
Films directed by Henry Edwards
Films set in the 19th century
Films set in France
Films set in England
British black-and-white films
Films based on works by Ethel M. Dell
Films based on British novels
Remakes of British films
Sound film remakes of silent films
Films shot at Twickenham Film Studios
1930s English-language films
1930s British films